Hira Lal (born 26 November 1980) is an Indian alpine skier. He competed in the men's giant slalom at the 2006 Winter Olympics.

Alpine skiing results
All results are sourced from the International Ski Federation (FIS).

Olympic results

World Championship results

References

External links
 

1980 births
Living people
People from Manali, Himachal Pradesh
Skiers from Himachal Pradesh
Indian male alpine skiers
Olympic alpine skiers of India
Alpine skiers at the 2006 Winter Olympics
Alpine skiers at the 2011 Asian Winter Games
Alpine skiers at the 2017 Asian Winter Games